Saeid Mehdipour; is an Iranian football defender who currently plays for the Iranian football club Machine Sazi in the Iran Pro League.

Club career

Gostaresh Foulad
Mehdipour was a part of Gostaresh Foulad from 2012 to 2014. In the summer of 2014 he terminated his contract with the Tabrizi side.

Shahrdari Tabriz
In summer 2014, Mehdipour signed a contract with Tractor Sazi but the Iran Football League Organization did not let him play for Tractor Sazi until mid-season as of their full Pro League quota. In August 2014 he joined Shahrdari Tabriz. He made just one appearance for Shahrdari Tabriz and on November 19, 2014 he was fired from the training camp by the club coach Mehdi Pashazadeh.

Saba Qom
Mehdipour joined Saba Qom in December 2014 under a contract until the end of the season. He made his debut against Sepahan as a starter on December 10, 2014.

Club career statistics

References

External links
 Saeid Mehdipour at PersianLeague.com

1987 births
Living people
Sportspeople from Tabriz
Iranian footballers
Gostaresh Foulad F.C. players
Shahrdari Tabriz players
Saba players
Siah Jamegan players
Machine Sazi F.C. players
Petrochimi Tabriz F.C. players
Association football central defenders